Patrick John Conaghan (born 31 January 1971) is an Australian politician. He has been a member of the House of Representatives for Cowper in New South Wales, representing the Nationals since 2019.

Early career
Conaghan was born in Kempsey, New South Wales.

Prior to entering federal politics, he worked as a police officer in Kempsey before being transferred to Sydney as a detective and later on as a police prosecutor. He was also a councillor for Tunks Ward of North Sydney Council from 2004 to 2008, serving alongside future Member for North Sydney, Trent Zimmerman. After departing law enforcement, Conaghan became a lawyer and established his own practice specialising in criminal defence, Conaghan Lawyers before being elected.

Politics
Conaghan was elected to the House of Representatives for the electoral division of Cowper at the 2019 Australian federal election, succeeding retiring incumbent Luke Hartsuyker.

In August 2022, Conaghan attracted media attention after remarks about Australian Greens MP Max Chandler-Mather for not wearing a tie in Parliament House and objecting to the "state of undress". Conaghan would continue to complain about the MP's attire despite Speaker Milton Dick's dismissal of the concern and would later say in a statement that "This is not a barbecue. This is question time in the Australian parliament. What next, board shorts and thongs? Maybe a onesie in winter". According to the House of Representatives Practice rulebook, attire is at discretion of the Speaker in the House of Representatives.

Personal
Conaghan lives in Port Macquarie, New South Wales with his wife, Ilona, and their two children.

References 

National Party of Australia members of the Parliament of Australia
1971 births
Living people
Australian barristers
Australian police officers
Australian prosecutors
Criminal defense lawyers
North Sydney Council
Police detectives
Members of the Australian House of Representatives
Members of the Australian House of Representatives for Cowper
People from the Mid North Coast
21st-century Australian lawyers
21st-century Australian politicians